The Church of Jesus Christ of Latter-day Saints in Indonesia refers to the Church of Jesus Christ of Latter-day Saints (LDS Church) and its members in Indonesia. The first small branch was established in 1970. Since then, the LDS Church in Indonesia has grown to more than 7,500 members in 24 congregations.

History

Ezra Taft Benson, Bruce R. McConkie and other church leaders visited Indonesia in October 1969, and on October 26, Taft Benson dedicated Indonesia for Missionary work. On January 5, 1970, 6 missionaries, the first in Indonesia, from the Southeast Asia Mission arrived in Jakarta. On February 15, 1970, the Jakarta Branch was organized. The Church was officially recognized by the Republic of Indonesia on August 11, 1970. By the end of the year, missionaries were also working in Bandung and Bogor.

The Java District was created on 16 November 1972. In 1975, Tjan Hardjiono and Suharto became the first two Indonesians to serve full-time missions in their homeland. On July 1st 1975, the Indonesia Jakarta Mission was created. The first president, Hendrik Gout, was born in Java and had joined the Church in 1953 in the Netherlands. The Book of Mormon was printed in the language of Bahasa Indonesia in 1977. In the mid 1990's missionaries began ministering in Sumatra and Sulawesi.

In January of 2000, Church President Gordon B. Hinckley met with Indonesia’s President Abdurrahman Wahid and members of his cabinet. In April of 2003, Subandriyo became the first Indonesian sustained and set apart to serve as an Area Authority Seventy where he overseed the church’s office in Jakarta as well as supervising construction efforts in Malaysia, Cambodia, and elsewhere in Southeast Asia.

On October 26, 2019, nearly 1200 members and friends gathered to celebrate the 50th Anniversary of The Church of Jesus Christ of Latter-day Saints in Indonesia.
On November 21, 2019, Church President Russell M. Nelson visited Indonesia where he met with the Vice President of Indonesia, Ma'ruf Amin. He also met with church members and others later in the day.

Humanitarian Service
The Church has completed several humanitarian projects in Indonesia and has provided aid during and following natural disasters. Members of the church donated more than 20,000 hours of service after the October 2010 Merapi volcano eruptions. Following the 2004 tsunami, Church members from around the world donated money to aid Indonesians, and schools have been built. The LDS Church provided funding, engineering, technical advice and supervision for providing water to 28,000 Indonesians.  In addition missionaries and church members are encouraged to voluntarily serve in their communities.

Stakes

As of February 2023, 2 stakes, a district, and four branches not part of a stake or district were located in Indonesia:

All congregations not in a stake, regardless of size, are branches within a mission. The Indonesia Jakarta Mission Branch serves individuals and families in Indonesia not in proximity to a meetinghouse.

In addition, a church Employment Resource Center is located in Jakarta.

Missions
Indonesia was part of the Southeast Asia Mission upon arrival of the first missionaries in 1970. On 1 July 1975, the Indonesia Jakarta Mission was created. Due to government restrictions between 1978 and 1980, the mission was discontinued in December of 1980 and missionary efforts were coordinated by the Singapore Mission. The Indonesia Jakarta Mission was re-opened in July 1985 with Effian Kadarusman as president, who served for four years until 1989 when the mission once became part of the Singapore mission due to government restrictions. The Indonesia Jakarta Mission was re-opened again in 1995.

Temples
As of February 2023, Indonesia was assigned to the Hong Kong Temple District.

See also
Religion in Indonesia

References

External links
 The Church of Jesus Christ of Latter-day Saints Official site (Indonesian)
 LDS Church in Indonesia Newsroom (Indonesian)
 ComeUntoChrist.org Latter-day Saints Visitor site

 
Church of Jesus Christ of Latter-day Saints